  

Like most large cities in the United States, there existed a large network of streetcars in Cleveland in the first half of the 20th century.  The streetcar lines in Cleveland, Ohio were operated by the Cleveland Railway, which was formed in 1910 with the merger of two companies.  The Cleveland Railway converted a few streetcar lines in the 1930s, but the onset of World War II stopped any further conversions.

In 1942, the Cleveland Transit System took over the operation of all streetcar, bus and trackless trolley lines from the Cleveland Railway. Following the war, CTS undertook a program of replacing all existing streetcar lines with either trackless trolleys or buses.

The last CTS streetcar ran on January 24, 1954 with a free ride celebration on the Madison line from Public Square to West 65th and Bridge.

List of streetcar lines

The following table lists the conversion of the Cleveland streetcar lines to trackless trolleys (or trolleybuses) or buses in reverse chronological order, with the last date of streetcar service, the line name, the modern line number, the type of vehicle replacing the streetcar, and the length of time that lasted.  Shuttle lines or "dinkeys" are not included.

See also
 Greater Cleveland Regional Transit Authority
 Northern Ohio Railway Museum
 List of streetcar systems in the United States (all-time list)

References

Inline references

Books

External links
Tom's North American Trolleybus Pix Cleveland Page

Transportation in Cleveland
Transportation in Cuyahoga County, Ohio
Passenger rail transportation in Ohio
Streetcars in Ohio
Cleveland